The Opa-locka Thematic Resource Area  is a group of thematically-related historic sites in Opa-locka, Miami-Dade County, Florida, United States.  The area comprises 20 surviving Moorish Revival buildings which are listed on the National Register of Historic Places.  The buildings were designed in the mid-1920s by architect Bernhardt E. Muller as part of the development of Opa-locka by Glenn Hammond Curtiss, an aviation pioneer, and his development and sales company, Opa-locka Company.  In developing Opa-locka, Curtiss sought to follow a theme inspired by the Arabian Nights.  The designated buildings include the Opa-locka Company administration building, considered the anchor of the Opa-locka development, the Opa-locka railroad station, and the development's first commercial building, the Harry Hurt Building.

History of the sites
After Glenn Curtiss, an aviation pioneer, retired from aircraft development and manufacturing in the 1920s, he became a real estate developer in Florida.  In 1926, during the Florida land boom of the 1920s, Curtiss founded the Opa-locka project on 4.2 acres of land in northwestern Miami-Dade County, Florida.   The Opa-locka Company was the development and sales company established by Curtiss for his Opa-locka project.

Curtiss named the development "Opa-tisha-wocka-locka", which meant "a big island covered with many trees and swamps."  He shortened it to Opa-locka.  Curtiss hired the American architect Bernhardt E. Muller to design the town in the themes of an "Arabian Fantasy" or "Arabian Nights."  Some sources indicate that Curtiss was inspired by his viewing of the 1924 motion picture The Thief of Baghdad.

Muller designed 86 buildings in Opa-locka in a Moorish Revival style.  The buildings elements include onion-shaped domes, minarets, crenelated parapets, Saracenic arches, watchtowers, mosaic tile, and outdoor spiral staircases. The streets were given Arabian-related names, such as Ali Baba Avenue, Sharazad Avenue, Caliph Street, Sinbad Avenue, Sesame Street, and Aladdin Street.

The Administration Building has been described as "the anchor of the new city," and was designed by Muller as the headquarters for the Opa-locka Company.  It was later used as Opa-locka's City Hall.  The building has been called "The Nation's Weirdest City Hall", and was reported to have been inspired by the description of the palace of the Emperor Kosroushah in One Thousand and One Nights.  The Administration Building includes "a dazzling array of domes, minarets, and arches, which combined to create a delightful oriental palace and afforded the appearance of a magical, fantasy city."

The 1926 Miami hurricane struck in September of that year and destroyed many of the original Moorish-style buildings, but some survived. Based on a survey and documentation prepared later in the twentieth century, twenty of the surviving structures have been listed on the National Register of Historic Places.  The Opa-locka Company administration building is one of the listed buildings. Three other commercial buildings were listed on the National Register together.

List of registered sites

The following buildings were added to the National Register of Historic Places as part of a Multiple Property Submission with the 1981 study, or later, consistently with the study guidelines of the Opa-locka Thematic Resource Area report.

See also
Curtiss & Bright, a partnership entity that also developed in this area
National Register of Historic Places listings in Miami-Dade County, Florida

References

External links
 A trip around Opa-Locka Thematic Resource area, Jan. 2013

Opa-locka, Florida
Opa-Locka
Buildings and structures in Miami-Dade County, Florida
National Register of Historic Places Multiple Property Submissions in Florida